The FBD, also called the FBD Insurance League, FBD Connacht League, the Connacht FBD Football League or FBD Insurance Connacht GAA Senior Football Competition, is an annual Gaelic football competition organised by Connacht GAA and sponsored by FBD. The participants are the five county teams.

Formerly several third-level college teams also competed, but from 2018 onward it became an all-county tournament. In 2019 and 2020 it was a knockout tournament with no league element, and so it was called the "Connacht GAA Senior Football Competition"; in 2023 it was simply referred to as "the FBD." It was cancelled in 2021 due to the impact of the COVID-19 pandemic on Gaelic games, but returned in January 2022.

Galway lead the way with most titles.

The trophy is named for Paddy Francis Dwyer (1937–1994), a longtime referee and official with Oran and the Roscommon County Board; he was also an activist in the National Farmers' Association in their 1966–67 farmers' rights campaign. He was the manager of FBD Insurance in the Connacht region.

Winners

No tournament was held in 2021 due to the COVID-19 pandemic.

References

 
Connacht GAA inter-county football competitions
Gaelic football leagues in Ireland
1995 establishments in Ireland
Sports leagues established in 1995